Rodolfo Hernández Vázquez (born 2 November 1969) is a Mexican former wrestler. He competed in the men's Greco-Roman 74 kg at the 1996 Summer Olympics.

References

External links
 

1969 births
Living people
Mexican male sport wrestlers
Olympic wrestlers of Mexico
Wrestlers at the 1996 Summer Olympics
Place of birth missing (living people)
Pan American Games medalists in wrestling
Pan American Games bronze medalists for Mexico
Wrestlers at the 1999 Pan American Games
Medalists at the 1999 Pan American Games
20th-century Mexican people
21st-century Mexican people